This Dragon Won't Sleep is the title of a recording by Canadian guitarist Don Ross, released in 1995. It is his first for Columbia/Sony Canada. It features full band arrangements on most of the songs and a few solo guitar pieces.

Track listing

 "Godzilla"
 "Head & Heart"
 "Obrigado (Egberto)"
 "This Dragon Won't Sleep"
 "Yoyomama"
 "Any Colour But Blue"
 "Groovy Sunflowers"
 "Afraid to Dance"
 "Tierra Maya"
 "Catherine"
 "Au jardin D'Amour"
 "Big Steps in Little Shoes"
 "Zarzuela"

Personnel
Don Ross – guitar

Don Ross (guitarist) albums
1995 albums